Dragan Šolak is a Serbian businessman and media mogul. He is the founder and erstwhile majority owner of the United Group media house. Šolak founded United Group back in 2000. Initially starting out as just a small cable operator in central Serbia, the company has since become one of the most dominant media companies in Southeast Europe, providing broadband, mobile and TV services in eight countries. He holds the position of Chairman of advisory board and retains 33% share in the entity. In early 2022, he became the owner of Premier League club Southampton F.C., as the lead investor in Sport Republic, which bought 80% of the shares in Southampton from the Chinese businessman Gao Jisheng for about £100m.

His net worth as was estimated at €1.22 billion, and as of 2021 was understood to be the richest man in Serbia.

References

External links
Dragan Solak at united.group

Living people
1964 births
Serbian businesspeople
Serbian billionaires
Southampton F.C. directors and chairmen